María del Rocío Pineda Gochi (born 8 September 1955) is a Mexican politician affiliated with the PRI. She currently serves as Senator of the LXII Legislature of the Mexican Congress representing Michoacán.

References

1955 births
Living people
Politicians from Michoacán
Women members of the Senate of the Republic (Mexico)
Members of the Senate of the Republic (Mexico)
Institutional Revolutionary Party politicians
People from Zacapu
21st-century Mexican politicians
21st-century Mexican women politicians